Ovidiu Burcă (born 16 March 1980) is a Romanian football manager and current head coach of Liga II side Dinamo București.

Club career

Early career
Born in Slatina, Burcă began his youth career at Football School Gică Popescu.

Emelec 
He began his professional career in Ecuador at Club Sport Emelec in the Primera Categoría Serie A league making six appearances.

JEF United Ichihara 
A year later he got noticed by the Japanese club JEF United Ichihara and signed with them. He played there only four matches and impressed the scouts of Ventforet Kofu and he was transferred immediately.

Ventforet Kofu 
Burcă played sixteen matches and scored one goal for Ventforet.

Universitatea Craiova 
After a year in Ecuador and near two years in Japan, Burcă returned to Romania to play for FC Universitatea Craiova a total of 25 matches, which impressed FC Dinamo București who signed him.

Dinamo București 
He won with them the Romanian League during the 2003–04 season. After spending three years with Dinamo, Burcă signed a one-and-a-half-year and contract with FC Național.

Energie Cottbus 
In June 2007, Bundesliga side Energie Cottbus announced signing him a three-year contract deal. However, in his first Bundesliga season at the club he did not make any appearance due a serious injury, which resulted a year break in the 2007–08 season. Burcă was one of the key players at Cottbus and they named him as captain in 2009. He was loaned out in 2008 to Chinese club Beijing Guoan.

Politehnica Timișoara 
After his contract expired with the German side, Burcă signed a one-year contract with FC Politehnica Timișoara returning to Liga 1 after three years. He was handed the number 25 shirt. He made his debut in a Europa League play-off against Manchester City in a 2–0 loss.

Honours

Club
Dinamo Bucharest
Romanian League: 2003–04
Romanian Cup: 2002–03, 2003–04, 2004–05
 Romanian Supercup: 2004–05

References

External links
 
 
 
 

Living people
1980 births
Sportspeople from Slatina, Romania
Association football central defenders
Romanian footballers
Romania under-21 international footballers
C.S. Emelec footballers
J1 League players
J2 League players
JEF United Chiba players
Ventforet Kofu players
FC U Craiova 1948 players
FC Dinamo București players
FC Progresul București players
FC Energie Cottbus players
Beijing Guoan F.C. players
FC Politehnica Timișoara players
FC Rapid București players
FC Rapid București presidents
Liga I players
Bundesliga players
2. Bundesliga players
Chinese Super League players
Romanian expatriate footballers
Expatriate footballers in Ecuador
Expatriate footballers in Japan
Expatriate footballers in Germany
Expatriate footballers in China
Romanian expatriate sportspeople in China
Romanian expatriate sportspeople in Japan
Romanian expatriate sportspeople in Germany
Romanian expatriate sportspeople in Ecuador
Romanian football managers
CSM Slatina (football) managers
FC Dinamo București managers